Lewis Gilbert (1920–2018) was a British filmmaker.

Lewis Gilbert may also refer to:

 Lewis Gilbert (actor) (1862–1925), British actor of the silent era
 Lewis Gilbert (American football) (born 1956), American football tight end 
 Louis Gilbert (1906–1987), American football halfback

See also
Gilbert Lewis (disambiguation)